Bayou Caddy is a stream in Hancock County, Mississippi, United States.  It is a tributary of the Mississippi Sound.

See also
List of rivers of Mississippi

References

Bayou Caddy
Landforms of Hancock County, Mississippi